Mohan Meakins Cricket Stadium or Narendra Mohan Sports Stadium is a cricket ground in Ghaziabad, India. The stadium has hosted 12 Ranji Trophy matches from 1977 when home team Uttar Pradesh cricket team and Baroda cricket team played other. The ground was also host 1977/78 Ranji Trophy finals featuring Uttar Pradesh cricket team and Karnataka cricket team.

The stadium one of 25 venue for 1997 Women's Cricket World Cup and hosted two matches between Netherlands Women's and New Zealand Women's and again between India Women's and Netherlands Women's.

References

External links 
 cricinfo
 cricketarchive
 wikimapia

Sports venues in Uttar Pradesh
Cricket grounds in Uttar Pradesh
Multi-purpose stadiums in India
Sport in Ghaziabad
Sports venues completed in 1971
1971 establishments in Uttar Pradesh
Buildings and structures in Ghaziabad, Uttar Pradesh
20th-century architecture in India